This is a list of the National Register of Historic Places listings in Calhoun County, Texas.

This is intended to be a complete list of properties listed on the National Register of Historic Places in Calhoun County, Texas. There is one property listed on the National Register in the county. A former property has been removed from the register.

Current listings

The locations of National Register properties may be seen in a mapping service provided.

|}

Former listings

|}

See also

National Register of Historic Places listings in Texas
Recorded Texas Historic Landmarks in Calhoun County

References

External links

Calhoun County, Texas
Calhoun County
Buildings and structures in Calhoun County, Texas